Antonio Ariel Agüero (born 18 August 1980) is a football centre back.

External links
 Ariel Agüero – Argentine Primera statistics at Fútbol XXI  
 Ariel Agüero at BDFA.com.ar 
 Ariel Agüero at Soccerway

1980 births
Living people
Sportspeople from San Juan Province, Argentina
Argentine footballers
Association football defenders
Argentine Primera División players
Club de Gimnasia y Esgrima La Plata footballers
San Martín de San Juan footballers
Juventud Alianza players
Quilmes Atlético Club footballers
Independiente Rivadavia footballers
Sportivo Desamparados footballers